The abbreviation MNI or M.N.I. may stand for:

 Malaysian Newsprint Industries, a Malaysian pulp and paper company
 Market News International, international capital markets news website
 Member of the Nautical Institute of the United Kingdom
 Miami Network Interface, an API for Amiga computers
 Minimum number of individuals that a cluster of bones may belong to
 Ministry of National Integration, a department of the government of Brazil
 mni, ISO 639-2 and ISO 639-3 code for the Meitei language of Manipur
 John A. Osborne Airport, Montserrat, IATA code
 Montreal Neurological Institute and Hospital, Canada
 MuggleNet Interactive, a website for Harry Potter fans